Cosmosoma subflamma is a moth of the subfamily Arctiinae. It was described by Francis Walker in 1854. It is found in Brazil and on Santa Lucia.

Subspecies
Cosmosoma subflamma subflamma (Brazil)
Cosmosoma subflamma lucia Schaus, 1896 (Santa Lucia)

References

subflamma
Moths described in 1854